Juan Carlos I Antarctic Base, named after the former king of Spain, Juan Carlos I, is a seasonal (November to March) scientific station operated by Spain, opened in January 1988. Situated on Hurd Peninsula, Livingston Island in the South Shetland Islands, Antarctica.

The base is controlled by the Marine Technology Unit of the Spanish National Research Council and is 20 miles away from the Spanish Antarctic base Gabriel de Castilla.

The base has undergone several renovations, the closest remodeling was completed in 2018 and it was inaugurated by the Science Minister, Pedro Duque, on February 2, 2019. This latest renovation involved the construction of "new facilities [that] have allowed it to double its capacity, up to 51 people, and increase the space available for scientific and technical personnel in laboratories."

Location
The base is on the coast of Española Cove, South Bay, in the northern foothills of Mount Reina Sofía, and 2.7 km south-southwest of the Bulgarian base St. Kliment Ohridski. The two bases are linked by a 5.5 km overland route via Johnsons Glacier, Charrúa Gap, Contell Glacier and Krum Rock.

See also
 Gabriel de Castilla Base
 List of Antarctic research stations
 List of Antarctic field camps
 Livingston Island
 Camp Byers

Gallery

Maps
 Isla Livingston: Península Hurd. Mapa topográfico de escala 1:25000. Madrid: Servicio Geográfico del Ejército, 1991. (Map reproduced on p. 16 of the linked work)
 L .L. Ivanov et al. Antarctica: Livingston Island and Greenwich Island, South Shetland Islands. Scale 1:100000 topographic map. Sofia: Antarctic Place-names Commission of Bulgaria, 2005.
 L. L. Ivanov. Antarctica: Livingston Island and Greenwich, Robert, Snow and Smith Islands. Scale 1:120000 topographic map. Troyan: Manfred Wörner Foundation.
 Antarctic Digital Database (ADD). Scale 1:250000 topographic map of Antarctica. Scientific Committee on Antarctic Research (SCAR). Since 1993, regularly upgraded and updated.
 L.L. Ivanov. Antarctica: Livingston Island and Smith Island. Scale 1:100000 topographic map. Manfred Wörner Foundation, 2017.

Bibliography
 Ivanov, L. General Geography and History of Livingston Island. In: Bulgarian Antarctic Research: A Synthesis. Eds. C. Pimpirev and N. Chipev. Sofia: St. Kliment Ohridski University Press, 2015. pp. 17–28.

References

External links
 Marine Technology Unit: Juan Carlos I
 COMNAP Antarctic Facilities
 COMNAP Antarctic Facilities Map

Geography of Livingston Island
Outposts of the South Shetland Islands
Science and technology in Antarctica
Science and technology in Spain
1989 establishments in Antarctica
Spain and the Antarctic
1989 establishments in Spain
Antarctic Base